The Doclean Academy of Sciences and Arts (Montenegrin and Serbian: Dukljanska akademija nauka i umjetnosti, DANU / Дукљанска академија наука и уметности, ДАНУ; Latin Academia Dioclitiana Scientiarum et Artium) is a parallel scholars' academy in Montenegro. It is named after the medieval state of Duklja, a historical predecessor to modern Montenegrin state. DANU is one of two established academies in the country, other being the Montenegrin Academy of Sciences and Arts (CANU).

The academy was created in 1998 by scholars who considered CANU to be dominantly influenced by Serbian nationalism and essentially a branch of SANU, and wanted to establish an independent Montenegrin academy instead.

DANU grants the following awards:
Saint Vladimir of Duklja Award – awarded biannually for lifetime achievement 
Sclavorum Regnum Award – awarded for achievement in the sciences
Lesendro Award – awarded for achievement in Montenegrin literature
Njegoš Award – awarded for achievement within the Academy and in the promotion of Montenegrin sciences and arts
In 2015 DANU reportedly merged into the Montenegrin Academy of Sciences and Arts.

Prominent members
Božo Nikolić, engineer
Zuvdija Hodžić, writer
Radmila Vojvodić, playwright, director 
Dimitrije Popović, painter
Radovan Radonjić, political scientist
Šerbo Rastoder, historian
Boško Odalović, painter
Rajko Todorović Todor, painter
Mladen Lompar, writer
Sreten Asanović, writer
Blagota Mitrić, jurist
Nebojša Vučinić, attorney
Miodrag Perović, sculptor
Sreten Perović, writer
Vukić Pulević, biologist
Danilo Radojević, historian of literature 
Branko Radojičić, geographer
Božidar Šekularac, historian
Vojislav Vulanović, writer
Slobodan Backović, physicist

Honorary members
 Ion Diaconescu, political activist
 Giuseppe Parodi Domenichi di Parodi, archaeologist
 Stanislav Dovgiy, physicist and mathematician
 Justo Jorge Padrón, poet and essayist
 Mateja Matevski, poet, critic and essayist
 František Lipka, diplomat, poet and translator

Former and deceased members
Vojislav Nikčević
Mirko Kovač, writer
Obren Blagojević, (also member of CANU and SANU, Honorary President)
Mihajlo Kuliš, MD
Radoje Pajović, historian
Veselin Aga Simović, engineer
Jevrem Brković, writer

See also
 Duklja
 Montenegrin Academy of Sciences and Arts

References

External links
 

Organizations established in 1999
Academy of Sciences and Arts
Scientific organisations based in Montenegro
1999 establishments in Montenegro
Montenegrin nationalism